Jane Eyre is a 1970 British television film directed by Delbert Mann, starring George C. Scott and Susannah York. It is based on the 1847 novel Jane Eyre by Charlotte Brontë. The film had its theatrical debut in the United Kingdom in 1970 and was released on television in the United States in 1971.

Plot 

Jane Eyre is an orphan, who is raised by her abusive aunt and cousins until she is sent to the cruel school institution of Lowood School. 
Her best friend, who had a severe cough, was forced to stand outside in the rain and died the next day. On leaving, Jane takes a position as governess to a girl named Adele at Thornfield Hall. Fully aware of her low rank and plain countenance, she makes the best of her situation. But Thornfield holds many secrets and despite mysterious occurrences that Jane cannot comprehend, she and Edward Rochester, owner of Thornfield and Adele's guardian, fall in love. Suddenly, when Jane is about to win the happiness she deserves, a dark secret comes to light which needs all her courage, love and maturity.

Cast

Chinese release 
In the 1980s, the movie was dubbed into Mandarin and widely released in China. The two leading voice actor and actress are 邱岳峰 (Qiu Yuefeng) and 李梓 (Li Zi)   . The dubbed version became dominant form by which the classic was known to the Chinese, with the dubbed monologues of the film becoming more widely recited than the original English. The dubbed version was also released on audio cassette tape, and the cassette version was more popular than the dubbed film.

Awards 
1972: Emmy Award - Outstanding Achievement in Music Composition (John Williams).

Soundtrack 
John Williams composed the score, recording it at Anvil Studios, Denham, outside London.

References

External links 
 
 
 Review at JaneEyre.net

1970 films
1970 drama films
1970s English-language films
British drama films
Films shot at Pinewood Studios
Films based on Jane Eyre
Films directed by Delbert Mann
Films scored by John Williams
Films about nannies
1970s British films